Stochastic partial differential equations (SPDEs) generalize partial differential equations via random force terms and coefficients, in the same way ordinary stochastic differential equations generalize ordinary differential equations.

They have relevance to quantum field theory, statistical mechanics, and spatial modeling.

Examples 
One of the most studied SPDEs is the stochastic heat equation, which may formally be written as

where  is the Laplacian and  denotes space-time white noise. Other examples also include stochastic versions of famous linear equations, such as wave equation and Schrödinger equation.

Discussion 
One difficulty is their lack of regularity. In one dimensional space, solutions to the stochastic heat equation are only almost 1/2-Hölder continuous in space and 1/4-Hölder continuous in time. For dimensions two and higher, solutions are not even function-valued, but can be made sense of as random distributions.

For linear equations, one can usually find a mild solution via semigroup techniques.

However, problems start to appear when considering non-linear equations. For example

where  is a polynomial. In this case it is not even clear how one should make sense of the equation. Such an equation will also not have a function-valued solution in dimension larger than one, and hence no pointwise meaning. It is well known that the space of distributions has no product structure. This is the core problem of such a theory. This leads to the need of some form of renormalization.

An early attempt to circumvent such problems for some specific equations was the so called da Prato-Debussche trick which involved studying such non-linear equations as perturbations of linear ones. However, this can only be used in very restrictive settings, as it depends on both the non-linear factor and on the regularity of the driving noise term. In recent years, the field has drastically expanded, and now there exists a large machinery to guarantee local existence for a variety of sub-critical SPDE's.

See also 
 Brownian surface
 Kardar–Parisi–Zhang equation
 Kushner equation
 Malliavin calculus
 Wick product
 Zakai equation

References

Further reading

External links 
 
 

Stochastic differential equations
Partial differential equations